Alathur is a village in Tiruchirappalli taluk of Tiruchirappalli district, Tamil Nadu. It was merged with the Tiruchirappalli Corporation in 2011.

Demographics 

As per the 2017 census, Alathur had a population of 3500 with 1700 males and 1300 females. The sex ratio was 1570 and the literacy rate, 80.5.

References 

Villages in Tiruchirappalli district